The Tecaxic-Calixtlahuaca head is a terracotta head, probably originally part of a larger figurine, discovered in 1933 among pre-Columbian or just post-Columbian grave goods in the Tecaxic-Calixtlahuaca zone in the Toluca Valley, approximately 65 kilometers northwest of Mexico City.

Because the head appears to be similar in style to artifacts of Roman origin, some believe that it is evidence of pre-Columbian trans-oceanic contact between Rome and the Americas, a view strongly promoted by archaeologist Romeo H. Hristov. However, several other explanations for its presence have also been put forward.

Find 
The object was discovered by archaeologist José García Payón during an excavation in 1933. It was a grave offering, found under three intact floors of a pyramidal structure. Along with the head were found a number of objects made of gold, copper, turquoise, rock crystal, jet, bone, shell and pottery. The burial was dated to between 1476 and 1510 AD. Payón did not publish information about the head itself until 1960.

Evidence for Roman manufacture 
An assessment of the case was made in 2001 by Romeo H. Hristov of University of New Mexico and Santiago Genovés T. of National Autonomous University of Mexico.

A thermoluminescence test performed in 1995 by P. Schaaf and G.A. Wagner in the FS Archäometrie unit in Heidelberg, Germany established its age range to somewhere between the 9th century BC and the middle of the 13th century AD, confirming its pre-colonial provenance. However, Schaaf and Wagner have objected to the way the dates were described by Hristov and Genoves.

Hypotheses 
Researchers who have analyzed the artifact have come up with several possible explanations for the object's presence at the site:
 A hoax: according to an informal declaration by Paul Schmidt, an archaeologist at UNAM, the head was planted in the site by a participating archaeologist, Hugo Moedano, in an attempt to play a practical joke on José García Payón, supervisor of the dig. Schmidt moreover stated earlier that García Payón was not present during the entirety of the excavation. García Payón's son insists that his father stated that he was on the site at the time of discovery. According to Hristov, these allegations are hearsay, and because the individuals directly involved have since died, a confirmation or refutation of the allegations has become impossible.
 An import from an early European visitor who came to Central Mexico. The date range for the burial includes the early period of European exploration of the Americas, though it predates the first sustained contact with Mexico under Hernán Cortés. According to Hristov, it is possible but highly unlikely that the head was introduced during the Medieval or early Colonial period. Hristov notes that other historians have considered the possibility of a Norse visit to the region and that the figure's unusual head-dress bears a possible resemblance to Norse or Viking headgear.
 It was traded or carried to Asia, and was imported to America via a transpacific route from southeast Asia by a Chinese or Indian ship. This thesis was proposed by Robert Heine-Geldern in 1961.
 Hristov argues that a Roman, Phoenician, or Berber ship, or the drifting of such a shipwreck to the American shores is the best explanation. Hristov claims that the possibility of such an event has been made more likely by the discovery of evidence of travels from Romans, Phoenicians and Berbers in the 6th or 5th century BC to Tenerife and Lanzarote in the Canaries, and of a Roman settlement (from the 1st century BC to the 4th century AD) on Lanzarote. David Grove, an archaeologist at the University of Illinois, pointed out that being washed ashore from a Roman shipwreck does not imply any "contact", let alone Roman "discovery" of the New World.

See also 
 Out-of-place artifact

References

Bibliography 
 
 
 
 Smith, Michael E. "The 'Roman Figurine' Supposedly Excavated at Calixtlahuaca", Accessed: 2012-02-13. (Archived by WebCite® at https://www.webcitation.org/65PlUfqJr?url=http://www.public.asu.edu/~mesmith9/tval/RomanFigurine.html

External links 
 Calixtlahuaca's Head by Romeo H. Hristov
 The Calixtlahuaca Head by J. Huston McCulloch

1933 in Mexico
Heads in the arts
Pre-Columbian trans-oceanic contact
Terracotta sculptures